Gilbert Allart (16 June 1902 – 17 December 1989) was a French hurdler. He competed in the men's 110 metres hurdles at the 1924 Summer Olympics.

References

External links
 

1902 births
1989 deaths
Athletes (track and field) at the 1924 Summer Olympics
French male hurdlers
Olympic athletes of France
20th-century French people